Alessandro Semprini (born 24 February 1998) is an Italian footballer who plays as a defender for  club Trento.

Club career
He is a product of Brescia youth teams and started appearing on the bench for the senior squad in the 2015–16 Serie B season.

For the 2016–17 season he joined Juventus on loan. He mostly played for their Under-19 squad, including the 2016–17 UEFA Youth League. He also made two appearances on the bench for the senior squad in January 2017. At the end of the season he returned to Brescia.

On 16 January 2018, he joined Serie C club Arezzo on loan until the end of the season. He made his Serie C debut for Arezzo on 3 April 2018 in a game against Livorno as a 63rd-minute substitute for Fabio Della Giovanna.

Upon his return from loan, he signed a new three-year contract with Brescia on 13 August 2018. He made his first Serie B appearance for Brescia on 24 November 2018 in a game against Venezia, he started the game and was substituted at half-time.

On 5 January 2020 he made his Serie A debut in a 2–1 home loss against Lazio. On 27 June 2020 he scored his first Serie A goal in a 2–2 home draw against Genoa.

On 9 September 2021, he joined Carrarese in Serie C.

On 4 August 2022, Semprini moved to Trento on a two-year contract.

International career
He represented his country for the first time with the Under-16 squad on 13 March 2014 in a friendly against Croatia.

Career statistics

Club

References

1998 births
Living people
Footballers from Brescia
Italian footballers
Association football defenders
Serie A players
Serie B players
Serie C players
Brescia Calcio players
Juventus F.C. players
S.S. Arezzo players
Carrarese Calcio players
A.C. Trento 1921 players
Italy youth international footballers